A quatorzain (from  Italian quattordici or French quatorze, fourteen) is a poem of fourteen lines.  Historically the term has often been used interchangeably with the term "sonnet".  Various writers have tried to draw distinctions between "true" sonnets and quatorzains. Nowadays the term is seldom used, and when it is, it usually is used to distinguish fourteen-line poems that do not follow the various rules that describe the sonnet.

See also
Bref double
Fourteener

Further reading

Poetic forms
Sonnet studies